The Hanwha LifePlus International Crown is a biennial women's professional team golf tournament on the LPGA Tour. Eight national teams of four players each (32 players in total) participate in the match play event.

History
It debuted in 2014 at Caves Valley Golf Club in Owings Mills, Maryland, a suburb northwest of Baltimore. With selection based on the world rankings of individuals, the eight nations were announced the previous November: Australia, Chinese Taipei, Japan, South Korea, Spain, Sweden, Thailand, and the United States. Teams were divided into two pools and played round robin fourball for three days.  The top five teams (20 players) advanced to the ten singles matches on Sunday, with each nation facing the other four. Spain won all four singles matches to win the title with a total of fifteen points; Sweden split its matches to finish in second with eleven points. 

The second edition in 2016 took place at the Merit Club in Gurnee, Illinois, north of Chicago. The top two finishers from 2014, champion Spain and runner-up Sweden, did not qualify for 2016 and were replaced by China and England. The United States won the 2016 International Crown with 13 points, winning three out of four singles matches on Sunday with South Korea finishing second with 12 points.

The third, 2018, edition was played 4–7 Oct at the Jack Nicklaus Golf Club Korea in Incheon, South Korea.  The eight countries participating were South Korea, United States, Japan, England, Australia, Thailand, Sweden, and Chinese Taipei. This field was the same as 2016, with the exception of Sweden replacing China. The team members were finalized on 2 July 2018.

The 2020 event, scheduled for 27–30 August at the Centurion Club in St Albans, England, was canceled due to the COVID-19 pandemic.

In October 2022, the LPGA announced the return of the event for the 2023 season with a new name and title sponsor, the Hanwha LifePlus International Crown. It will be held at TPC Harding Park in San Francisco, California from 4–7 May 2023.

Sponsorship and future sites
UL, an American safety organization historically known as Underwriters Laboratories, was announced as the title sponsor for 2016 and 2018.

Hanwha Group, a large South Korean business conglomerate, was announced as the title sponsor for the 2023 event.

Winners

Results table

References

External links

 
LPGA Tour events
Team golf tournaments
Golf tournaments in the United States